Chris Ulugia (born 15 January 1992) is a New Zealand professional rugby league footballer who plays for Featherstone Rovers in the Betfred Championship.

Background
Ulugia was born in New Zealand and is of Samoan heritage. He moved to Australia at the age of three and represented New South Wales at youth level.

Playing career
Ulugia is a former Parramatta junior and who then played in the Queensland Cup for the Mackay Cutters. He was the part of the Cutters side that won the 2013 Queensland Cup.

Bradford
Ulugia signed for Bradford Bulls on a 2-year deal in 2015. He featured in the pre-season friendlies against Castleford and Leeds. He scored against Leeds (1 try).

He featured in Round 1 (Leigh Centurions) then in Round 3 (Featherstone Rovers). Ulugia played in Round 5 (Batley Bulldogs) then in Round 7 (Halifax). He featured in Round 9 (London Broncos). Ulugia played in the Challenge Cup in Round 5 (Hull Kingston Rovers). He scored against Featherstone Rovers (2 tries), Batley Bulldogs (1 try) and London Broncos (1 try).

He was later loaned out to Oxford and then Batley Bulldogs. Batley Bulldogs attempted to sign Ulugia permanently for the 2016 season, however he failed to gain a visa and instead remained at Batley Bulldogs as a Bradford Bulls loanee.

As of season 2017, he is now with Featherstone Rovers.

References

External links

Featherstone Rovers profile

1992 births
Batley Bulldogs players
Bradford Bulls players
Featherstone Rovers players
Living people
Mackay Cutters players
New Zealand emigrants to Australia
New Zealand sportspeople of Samoan descent
Australian sportspeople of Samoan descent
Australian expatriate sportspeople in England
New Zealand expatriate sportspeople in England
New Zealand rugby league players
Australian rugby league players
Oxford Rugby League players
Place of birth missing (living people)
Rugby league centres
Rugby league wingers